Frances Reid is an American filmmaker, producer and cinematographer known for her documentaries. She has been in filmmaking for three decades. In 1994, she was nominated alongside director Dee Mosbacher for an Academy Award for Best Documentary Short for Straight from the Heart, which explored relationships between straight parents and their gay children. She was again nominated for an Oscar for producing and directing Long Night's Journey into Day (2000).

Activism
In 1977, Reid became an associate of the Women's Institute for Freedom of the Press (WIFP). WIFP is an American nonprofit publishing organization. The organization works to increase communication between women and connect the public with forms of women-based media.

Filmography

Director
 1994: Straight from the Heart
 1996: All God's Children
 1977: In the Best Interests of the Children
 2000: Long Night's Journey Into Day
 2005: Waging a Living (co-director)

Producer
 1994: Straight from the Heart (producer)
 1995: Skin Deep: Building Diverse Campus Communities (producer)
 2000: Long Night's Journey Into Today (producer)
 2003: Lost Boys of Sudan (executive producer)
 2005: Waging a Living (co-producer)
 2011: Happy

Cinematographer
 1984: The Times of Harvey Milk
 1987: Reno's Kids: 87 Days + 11
 1994: Complaints of a Dutiful Daughter
 1995: A Personal Journey with Martin Scorsese Through American Movies 
 2000: Long Night's Journey Into Day

References

External links
 

American documentary filmmakers
Living people
Year of birth missing (living people)
Place of birth missing (living people)